The Minnesota Mr. Football Award is an honor given to the top high school football player in the state of Minnesota.

Award winners
Professional teams listed are teams known.

References

External links
Minnesota Football Hub (list of past winners) 

Mr. Football awards
American football in Minnesota
2004 establishments in Minnesota